Almaz Chokmorov (born 18 January 1954) is an association football forward who played for Soviet club Alga Frunze throughout the 1970s and 1980s.

Career
Born in the Kyrgyzstan SSR, Chokmorov began playing professional football with Soviet First League side FC Alga Frunze where his older brother Mars, was a star player. Almaz spent four seasons in the Soviet First League with Alga, and had a brief spell in the Soviet Top League with Pakhtakor Tashkent. Chokmorov also played for the Soviet Union's national youth team.

Chokmorov scored more than 100 Soviet league goals for Alga, and the Football Federation of the Kyrgyz Republic named the award for players with at least 100 goals in Kyrgyzstan League after him.

References

External links
Profile at Footballfacts.ru

1954 births
Living people
Soviet footballers
Kyrgyzstani footballers
Association football forwards
FC Alga Bishkek players
Pakhtakor Tashkent FK players